John Phillip Peters (April 8, 1850 – January 4, 1924) was a shortstop who played in Major League Baseball with four clubs from  through . Peters batted and threw right-handed.

Biography
He was born in New Orleans, Louisiana.

Peters reached the majors in 1874 with the Chicago White Stockings (NA/NL), spending four years with them before moving to the Milwaukee Grays (NL, 1878), again with Chicago (NL, 1879), and the Providence Grays (NL, 1880), Buffalo Bisons (NL, 1881) and Pittsburgh Alleghenys (NL, 1882–1884).  He was the everyday shortstop of the pennant-winning 1876 Chicago White Stockings in the very first year of the National League.

Peters averaged .328 from 1876 to 1878, with a career-high .351 in the 1876 championship season to finish fourth in the National League batting title behind Ross Barnes (.429), George Hall (.366) and Cap Anson (.356). He also twice led the shortstops in putouts in 1879 (280) and 1890 (277).

While in Chicago, Peters shared infield defense duties with first basemen Cal McVey and Albert Spalding;  2B Ross Barnes, 3B Cap Anson, and catchers Deacon White and Cal McVey as well. In 1881, with Buffalo, he again played on a team that featured early stars as Davy Force (IF), Dan Brouthers (1B) and Jim O'Rourke (OF).

In an 11-season career, Peters was a .278 hitter (748-for-2695) with three home runs and 249 RBI in 615 games, including 372 runs, 92 doubles, 12 triples, and 14 stolen bases.

He died in St. Louis, Missouri, at the age of 73.

External links
Baseball Reference
The Deadball Era
Retrosheet

Buffalo Bisons (NL) players
Chicago White Stockings players
Milwaukee Grays players
Pittsburgh Alleghenys players
Providence Grays players
Major League Baseball shortstops
19th-century baseball players
Baseball players from Louisiana
1850 births
1924 deaths
Springfield, Illinois (minor league baseball) players
Stillwater (minor league baseball) players